Kerr Scott Farm, also known as Melville, is a historic home and farm located near Haw River, Alamance County, North Carolina. The vernacular farmhouse was built in 1919, and consists of a 1 1/2-story, frame, center hall plan, hip-roofed main block, with a one-story frame gable-roofed ell built about 1860. The property includes a variety of contributing outbuildings including a farm office (c. 1920s), milk house (c. 1920s), woodshed (c. 1930s), dairy barns (1910, 1929 and 1941), equipment building / machine shop (1941), cow shed (c. 1940s), gas / oil house (c. 1940s), corn crib (1910), silos, and cow sheds.  It was the home of North Carolina governor and United States Senator, W. Kerr Scott (1896-1958) and the birthplace of W. Kerr Scott's son, also a former North Carolina governor, Robert W. Scott.

It was added to the National Register of Historic Places in 1987.

References

Farms on the National Register of Historic Places in North Carolina
Houses completed in 1919
Houses in Alamance County, North Carolina
National Register of Historic Places in Alamance County, North Carolina